Adrian Benjamin Bentzon (22 April 1777 – 15 January 1827) was Governor of the Danish West Indies from 1816 to 1820.

Biography
He was born in Tønsberg, Norway. He was the son of Hans Jacob Bentzon (1739–1810) and Sophia Hedvig Købke (1755–1810). He graduated from Bergen Cathedral School in 1793 and took his legal exams in 1798 at the University of Copenhagen. He was later adjunct and notary of the legal faculty. In 1814 he became part of the government of the Danish West Indies. In 1816 he was Governor at the level of Major General. He was named as Commander of the Order of the Dannebrog in 1817. In 1820 he became embroiled in scandal, and resigned as governor, but in 1825 he was acquitted by the Supreme Court of Denmark.

Personal life
In 1807, Bentzon was married to Magdalena Astor (1788–1832), daughter  of  John Jacob Astor. The marriage was not happy, their two children died, and she lived for several years with her parents in New York City. In 1819, Bentzon was granted  divorce. She subsequently married  Rev. John Bristed (1778–1855). 

Bentzon  died during 1827 at Christiansted, St. Croix.

References

Governors of the Danish West Indies
Norwegian military leaders
1777 births
1827 deaths
People from Tønsberg
University of Copenhagen alumni
Commanders of the Order of the Dannebrog
19th century in the Danish West Indies
19th-century Danish politicians